Burnt Sugar may refer to:

 Burnt Sugar (band), American improvisational music group
 Burnt Sugar (novel), 2019 novel by Avni Doshi
 Burnt Sugar (album), 2018 album by Gouge Away